Hyperaeschra is a genus of moths of the family Notodontidae erected by Arthur Gardiner Butler in 1880.

Selected species
Hyperaeschra dentata Hampson, [1893]
Hyperaeschra georgica (Herrich-Schäffer, 1855)
Hyperaeschra tortuosa Tepper, 1881
Hyperaeschra pallida Butler, 1882

References

Notodontidae